Reid Rocks  is a small island nature reserve in south-eastern Australia.  It is part of Tasmania’s New Year Island Group, which includes the much larger King Island, lying north-west of Tasmania in Bass Strait.  It is frequently wave-washed and lacks vegetation.

Fauna
Reid Rocks is the only breeding site for Australian fur seals in western Bass Strait.  During the 1990s annual mean seal pup production was 1500.

References

Notes

Sources
 Brothers, Nigel; Pemberton, David; Pryor, Helen; & Halley, Vanessa. (2001). Tasmania’s Offshore Islands: seabirds and other natural features. Tasmanian Museum and Art Gallery: Hobart. 

Islands of Bass Strait